Deuterated methanol (CD3OD), is a form (called an isotopologue) of methanol (CH3OH) in which the hydrogen atom ("H") is replaced with deuterium (heavy hydrogen) isotope ("D"). Deuterated methanol is a common solvent used in NMR spectroscopy.

Deuterated methanol was first detected in interstellar space was Orion-KL in 1988 by scientists at the Max Planck Institute for Radio Astronomy.

References 

Deuterated solvents
Methanol